The Annals of Applied Statistics is a peer-reviewed scientific journal published by the Institute of Mathematical Statistics, covering all areas of statistics, featuring papers in the applied half of this range. It was established in 2007, with Bradley Efron as founding editor-in-chief. According to the Journal Citation Reports, the journal has a 2016 impact factor of 1.578.

References

External links 
 

Statistics journals
Publications established in 2007
Quarterly journals
English-language journals
Institute of Mathematical Statistics academic journals